The Thomas's shaggy bat (Centronycteris centralis) is a bat species from Central and South America. It was previously included in the shaggy bat but Simmons and Handley (1998) showed that the species were distinct.

Taxonomy
It was described as a new species in 1912 by British mammalogist Oldfield Thomas. The holotype had been collected by H. J. Watson in 1898 in Panama. Its species name "centralis" is Latin for "in the middle."

Description
The fur of its back is gray while the fur around its eyes and near its uropatagium is reddish. Its ventral fur is yellowish.
Despite being in the sac-winged bat family, it lacks wing sacs. It is a small species, with individuals weighing only .

Biology and ecology
It is nocturnal, roosting in sheltered places during the day such as hollow trees. It forages for its insect prey with a "slow and maneuverable" flight.

It is found in Belize, Bolivia, Colombia, Costa Rica, Ecuador, Guatemala, Honduras, Mexico, Nicaragua, Panama, Peru, and Venezuela.

References

Centronycteris
Mammals described in 1912
Taxa named by Oldfield Thomas
Bats of Central America
Bats of South America